The (Roman Catholic) Diocese of Nakhon Sawan (Dioecesis Nakhonsauanensis) is located in central Thailand. It is a suffragan diocese of the archdiocese of Bangkok.

The diocese covers an area of 93,547 km², covering 13 provinces - Chainat, Kamphaeng Phet, Lopburi, Nakhon Sawan, Saraburi, Sukhothai, Tak, Uthai Thani, Uttaradit.

As of 2001, of the 8.2 million citizen 9,237 are member of the Catholic Church. It is divided into 28 parishes, having 27 priests altogether.

History
The diocese was erected on February 9, 1967, when it was split off from the archdiocese of Bangkok.

Cathedral
The St. Anna Cathedral is located in downtown Nakhon Sawan.

Bishops
Michel-Auguste-Marie Langer, M.E.P.: February 9, 1967 - May 24, 1976 (Resigned)
Joseph Banchong Aribarg: May 24, 1976 - November 5, 1998 (Resigned)
Louis Chamniern Santisukniram: November 5, 1998 - July 1, 2005 (became Archbishop of Thare and Nonseng)
Francis Xavier Kriengsak Kovitvanit: appointed March 7, 2007 - May 15, 2009 (became Archbishop of Bangkok)
Joseph Pibul Visitnondachai: appointed 19 June 2009

External links
Website of the diocese
catholic-hierarchy.org

Nakhon Sawan
Nakhon Sawan